"Six Feet Under" is the debut single by American singer Billie Eilish. It was first released through SoundCloud on June 23, 2016. It was later re-released on November 17, 2016, by Darkroom and Interscope Records. Finneas O'Connell, Eilish's brother, solely wrote and produced the track. The track is described as a "somber" and "delicate" pop ballad. Commercially, it was certified platinum by Music Canada (MC).

Background and composition
"Six Feet Under" was first originally released through Eilish's SoundCloud on June 23, 2016, as her second single. It was later released as a standalone single for digital download and streaming by Darkroom and Interscope Records on November 17, 2016. The track was written and produced by Eilish's brother, Finneas O'Connell. Mastering and mixing was handled by the studio personnel, John Greenham, and Rob Kinelski, respectively.

According to sheet music published by Hal Leonard Music Publishing on Musicnotes.com, "Six Feet Under" has a moderate tempo of 68 beats per minute. The song is played in the key of B minor, while Eilish's vocals span a range of A3 to D5. Press reviews described the song as an atmospheric pop ballad. Mike Wass of Idolator compared the instrumentation to the later work of Lana Del Rey, Låpsley and Birdy. An EP featuring remixes by Blu J, Gazzo, Jerry Folk and Aire Atlantica was released in January 2017. Dan Regan of Billboard favored Jerry Folk's remix over the others, saying it "punches you right in the face with its wall of vocal harmonies", and further says "silence weighs heavy throughout, adding weight to every note as it drips from the speaker into your brain". Lyrically, "Six Feet Under" is described as "somber" and "delicate" like "Ocean Eyes".

Reception
Upon its release, "Six Feet Under" was praised by Ryan Reed of Rolling Stone, who called the track "mournful" and "atmospheric".  The song has been awarded a platinum certification award from Music Canada (MC). It has also been certified gold by the Recording Industry Association of America (RIAA) and the Mexican Association of Producers of Phonograms and Videograms, A.C. (AMPROFON).

Promotion
A homemade music video for this song was released on June 30, 2016. It was directed by Eilish and shows clips of smoke balls in front of a fence, played both forward and in reverse. The video was edited by her mother, Maggie Baird. "Six Feet Under" was included on the setlist of Eilish's When We All Fall Asleep Tour (2019). The song was used in American Horror Story 9th season. In a brief promo clip posted on Instagram, director and writer Ryan Murphy, revealed a young woman running through the woods in slow-motion, being chased by a masked man holding a knife. The woman enters a cabin, crying and screaming as the blade breaks through the door.

Track listing

Personnel
Credits adapted from Tidal.
 Billie Eilish – vocals
 Finneas O'Connell – vocals, songwriter, production
 John Greenham – mastering
 Rob Kinelski – mixing

Certifications

References

2010s ballads
2016 singles
2016 songs
Billie Eilish songs
Pop ballads
Songs written by Finneas O'Connell
Song recordings produced by Finneas O'Connell
Interscope Records singles